Gmelin may refer to:
 Gmelin's test, a chemical test
 Gmelin database, a German handbook/encyclopedia of inorganic compounds initiated by Leopold Gmelin

People 
 Carl Christian Gmelin (1762–1837), German botanist, author of Flora Badensis, Alsatica et confinium regionum cis- et transrhenania (1806)
 Charles Gmelin (1872–1950), British Olympic athlete
 Christian Gottlob Gmelin (1792–1860), a German chemist and mineralogist
 Eberhardt Gmelin, who described a purported case of dissociative identity disorder in 1791
 Herta Däubler-Gmelin (born 1943), German politician (SPD), former German Minister of Justice
 Jeannine Gmelin (born 1990), Swiss Olympic rower
 Johann Friedrich Gmelin (1748–1804), German naturalist; publisher of the Systema Naturae of Carolus Linnaeus; son of Philip Friedrich
 Johann Georg Gmelin (1709–1755), German naturalist; explorer of Siberia, author of Flora Sibirica
 Leopold Gmelin (1788–1853), German chemist, son of Johann Friedrich
 Philipp Friedrich Gmelin (1721–1768), German botanist and chemist; brother of Johann Georg
 Samuel Gottlieb Gmelin (1744–1774), German naturalist; author of Historia Fucorum, the first work on marine biology; nephew of Johann Georg
 Wilhelm Gmelin (1891–1978), German footballer